The 2015 Asian Rugby Championship division tournaments refers to the divisions played within the annual Asian Rugby Championship rugby union tournament. The Asian Rugby Championship replaced the Asian Five Nations tournament. The main tournament is now participated by the top three teams in Asia, less teams competing at the 2014 Asian Five Nations, which saw the top five teams in Asia participate. In this edition, Hong Kong, Japan and South Korea participated at the main tournament.

Teams
The teams involved, with their world rankings pre tournament (as of 14 April), were:

Division 1
  (39)
  (52)
  (55)
  (38)

Division 2
  (60)
  (61)
  (65)
  (91)

Division 3

East
  (64)
  (80)
  (91)

West
  (NA)
  (NA)
  (NA)

South Central
  (69)
  (79) (withdrew) 
  (88)

Division 4

No tournaments for the Div 4 teams:
  (NA)
  (NA)
  (NA)
  (NA)
  (NA)
  (NA)
  (NA)
  (NA)

Division 1

Division 1 of the 2015 Asian Rugby Championship was held at the Philippine Sports Stadium in Bocaue, Bulacan from May 6, 2015 to May 9, 2015.

Fixtures

Semi-finals

Third place play-off

Final

Notes:
Due to financial reasons, the Top 3 Challenge match between Sri Lanka and South Korea scheduled for  6 June 2015 was cancelled. Sri Lanka remained in Division 1 for 2016 and South Korea remained in the Tri-nations division.

Division 2

The Division 2 tournament was held in Kuala Lumpur, Malaysia.

Table

Fixtures

Round 1

Round 2

Round 3

Division 3 East

The Division 3 East tournament was held in Jakarta, Indonesia.

Table

Fixtures

Round 1

Round 2

Round 3

Division 3 West

The Division 3 West tournament was held in Jounieh, Lebanon.

Table

Fixtures

Round 1

Round 2

Round 3

Division 3 Central

The Division 3 Central tournament will be held in Tashkent, Uzbekistan.  Pakistan were scheduled to participate, but had to withdraw due to financial concerns.  The tournament was reduced to India and Uzbekistan playing two tests to decide the winner of Division 3 Central.

Table

Fixtures

Round 1

Round 2

References

External links
ARFU

2015
2015 in Asian rugby union
2015 rugby union tournaments for national teams